El año del tigre may refer to:

 El año del tigre, a 2011 Chilean drama film
 El Año del Tigre, a 2023 Peruvian-Dominican comedy film